Francisco Jose F. Matugas II, also known as Bingo Matugas, (born March 18, 1963) is a Filipino politician from the first district of the province of Surigao del Norte, Philippines. He currently serves as representative of the province's first legislative district. He was first elected in the position in 2016.

His parents Francisco Matugas and Sol Forcadilla-Matugas are former governors of Surigao del Norte.

References

External links
Official Website
Official Profile

Living people
1969 births
People from Surigao del Norte
PDP–Laban politicians
Members of the House of Representatives of the Philippines from Surigao del Norte
University of San Carlos alumni
University of the Philippines alumni